Austin Lin (born January 27, 1988) is a Taiwanese actor, singer and television host. Born and raised in Taipei, Taiwan, he took part in the second season of Taiwanese singing competition, One Million Star, in 2007. In 2009, he made his acting debut in Taiwanese film, Somewhere I Have Never Traveled, for which he also sang on the soundtrack. In 2016, he appeared in Taiwanese film, At Cafe 6, and won a Golden Horse Award for Best Supporting Actor.

Filmography

Feature films 
 Somewhere I Have Never Traveled (2009)
 Leaving Gracefully (2011)
 Sweet Alibis (2014)
 Anywhere Somewhere Nowhere (2014)
 Endless Nights in Aurora (2014)
 The Missing Piece (2015)
 Go Lala Go 2 (2015)
 At Cafe 6 (2016)
 Interference Notes (2017)
 To My 19-Year-Old (2017)
 Someone in the Clouds (2019)
 The Knight of Shadows: Between Yin and Yang (2019)
 Wings Over Everest (2019)
  Somewhere Winter (2019)
 I WeirDo (2020)
 My Best Friend's Breakfast (2022)
 Marry My Dead Body (2023)

Television series 
 Rice Family (2010)
 Shiningstar (2011)
 The Soldiers (2011)
 Lady Maid Maid (2012)
 Home (2012)
 An Innocent Mistake (2012)
 The Pursuit of Happiness (2013)
 The Kindaichi Case Files (2014)
 The Best of Youth (2015)
 Rock Records in Love (2016) 
 I Will Never Let You Go (2017)
 Unexpected (2018)
 Legend of Huabuqi (2019)
 Tears on Fire (2021)
 Light the Night (2021)

Discography

Soundtrack albums 
 Somewhere I Have Never Traveled (2009)

Awards and nominations

References

External links 

1988 births
Living people
Male actors from Taipei
Taiwanese Mandopop singers
Taiwanese male television actors
Taiwanese male film actors
National Taiwan Normal University alumni
Musicians from Taipei
21st-century Taiwanese male actors
21st-century Taiwanese male singers
Taiwanese television presenters